Giovanni Grimaldi (14 November 1917 – 25 February 2001) was an Italian screenwriter, journalist and film director. He was sometimes credited as Gianni Grimaldi.

Biography

Born in Catania, Sicily, Grimaldi entered the cinema industry in 1952 as a screenwriter of a large number of often highly successful films, frequently working together with Bruno Corbucci. Since 1964 he became a prolific director of comedy films, often working with Lando Buzzanca and with the couple Franco and Ciccio.

Aside from films, Grimaldi was a journalist, a collaborator and even the director of several Italian humor magazines such as Trilussa, Candido and Marc'Aurelio. He was also a radio author, a playwright and a television director. He was the father of the director and screenwriter Aldo Grimaldi.

Selected filmography

Director and screenwriter 
 Questo pazzo, pazzo mondo della canzone (1965)
 In a Colt's Shadow (1965)
 James Tont operazione U.N.O. (1965)
 The Handsome, the Ugly, and the Stupid (1967)
 I 2 deputati (1968)
 Don Chisciotte and Sancio Panza (1968)
 Un caso di coscienza (1970)
 Il magnate (1973)
 La governante (1974) 
 Il fidanzamento (1975)

Screenwriter 
 I, Hamlet (1952)
 Matrimonial Agency (1953)
 It Happened at the Police Station (1954)
 Buonanotte... avvocato! (1955)
 Allow Me, Daddy! (1956)
 Who Hesitates is Lost (1960)
 The Two Marshals (1961)
 Totò, Peppino e... la dolce vita (1961)
 Gladiators 7 (1962)
 The Slave (1962)
 Lo smemorato di Collegno (1962)
 The Two Colonels (1962)
 Toto's First Night (1962)
 Toto vs. Maciste (1962)
 The Monk of Monza (1963)
 Toto vs. the Four (1963)
 Totò Diabolicus (1963)
 Toto and Cleopatra (1963)
 Sexy Toto (1963)
 I due mafiosi (1964)
 Tears on Your Face (1964)
 What Ever Happened to Baby Toto? (1964)
 Toto of Arabia (1965)
 Latin Lovers (1965)
 Mi vedrai tornare (1966)
 4 Dollars of Revenge (1966)
 Nel sole (1967)
 Angeli senza paradiso (1970)
 Paths of War (1970)
 When Women Were Called Virgins (1972)

Sources

External links
 

1917 births
2001 deaths
Italian film directors
20th-century Italian screenwriters
Italian male screenwriters
Italian dramatists and playwrights
Journalists from Catania
Italian male journalists
Italian male dramatists and playwrights
20th-century Italian dramatists and playwrights
20th-century Italian male writers
20th-century Italian journalists
Film people from Catania